To Live and Die in CA is the second compilation album by rapper Daz Dillinger. It was released on October 1, 2002 through D.P.G. Recordz.

Track listing

References

2002 compilation albums
Daz Dillinger compilation albums
D.P.G. Recordz albums
Albums produced by Big Hollis
Gangsta rap compilation albums